The 2015–16 season was Brentford's 126th year in existence and second consecutive season in the Championship. Along with competing in the Championship, the club also participated in the FA Cup and League Cup. The season covers the period from 1 July 2015 to 30 June 2016.

Season Review

August
Brentford's season began with a 2–2 draw against Ipswich Town. Kevin Bru and Ryan Fraser netted for the visitors but stoppage time goals from Andre Gray and James Tarkowski sealed a point for the Bees. Brentford then welcomed Oxford United to Griffin Park for the League Cup First Round but were thrashed 0–4 after fielding a weakened team. During this match, new signing Andreas Bjelland suffered a significant injury to the left knee and was forced out of action for 9 months. On 14 August, Brentford signed right-back Maxime Colin from Anderlecht for an undisclosed fee to replace Moses Odubajo who left to join Hull City. Jota underwent surgery after suffering damaged ankle ligaments in the opening match of the season against Ipswich Town and was expected to be out for around 3 months. On 21 August, Brentford's previous season top goal scorer Andre Gray joined Burnley for a club record fee. Burnley were Brentford's next opponents where they lost 1–0 to a first half Michael Keane header in a game where Gray was ineligible. Brentford then hosted Reading but succumbed to a 1–3 defeat after a poor first half. At the end of the month, Brentford brought in two loan signings: Marco Djuricin from Red Bull Salzburg for a season, and Sergi Canós from Liverpool on an initial half-season loan.

September
On transfer deadline day, Brentford concluded their summer transfer business with the signing of midfielder Ryan Woods from Shrewsbury Town for a reported £1 million. Brentford also extended the contract of injured striker Scott Hogan until the end of the 2017–18 season as he continued his recovery from a damaged anterior cruciate ligament. Brentford returned to action after the international break with a 1–1 draw away to Leeds United. Djuricin scored in the first half on his debut but Leeds equalised late in the second half after Woods, also on his debut, lost the ball in midfield which led to Mirco Antenucci slotting past Button. Brentford then travelled to Middlesbrough where they lost 3–1. A brace from Cristhian Stuani followed by a goal from Albert Adomah were enough to leave Brentford in 21st place, just above the relegation zone. Dijkhuizen celebrated his first home win at Brentford against Preston North End. Brentford had conceded within the first minute to a Daniel Johnson finish but won the vital three points after goals from Vibe and Djuricin in the second half with substitute Sergi Canós making a noticeable difference when he came on.

On 26 September, Brentford suffered defeat at home against Sheffield Wednesday in a game which finished with 10 men on each team. James Tarkowski was sent off in the first half with Atdhe Nuhiu scoring the resulting penalty. Alan Judge then curled home after a wonderful long pass from goalkeeper David Button. Jérémy Hélan was sent off for a second bookable offence shortly after but with Brentford pushing for a winner, Lucas João scored the decisive goal in the 90th minute which secured Brentford's fourth defeat in six games. Following that loss, on 28 September, Brentford announced that Dijkhuizen and his assistant, Roy Hendriksen had parted company with the club. Lee Carsley was promoted to First Team Head Coach alongside his assistant Paul Williams with Bees legend Kevin O'Connor replacing Carsley as Development Squad Head Coach. Carsley's first game in charge of Brentford was a 0–2 home defeat to Birmingham City. Second half goals from Michael Morrison and former Bee Clayton Donaldson sealed the win for the Blues.

October
On 1 October, Brentford signed Chelsea midfielder John Swift on an initial one month youth loan. Swift made his debut as a sub in Brentford's next game against Derby County. However, he was unable to stop Brentford losing 0–2 in what was a very poor performance overall for the Bees. Chris Martin and Tom Ince scored the goals for Derby in the first half. During the international break, Josh Clarke joined Barnet on loan until the start of 2016. Domestic football returned to Griffin Park with a 2–1 win over Rotherham United. Judge scored two goals with the first one being a fine volley from the edge of the area. Rotherham had equalised through Joe Mattock straight after the break but Judge soon struck again, this time with a powerful header.

Transfers & loans

Transfers in

Total spending: £5,000,000

Loans in

Transfers out

Total income:  £18,400,000

Loans out

Released

Pre season
On 7 May 2015, Brentford announced their first pre-season friendly against Luton Town on 28 July 2015. On 18 May 2015, Brentford confirmed they will face Premier League side Stoke City on 25 July 2015 in a pre-season friendly. A day later, the club confirmed their third friendly against Boreham Wood. On 8 June 2015, a friendly against Norwich City was announced. On 23 June 2015, Brentford announced a friendly against Portuguese side Farense. Also a Brentford XI side will face four pre-season fixtures.

Championship

League results summary

Results and position by round

League table

Matches
On 17 June 2015, the fixtures for the forthcoming season were announced.

Score overview

League Cup

On 16 June 2015, the first round draw was made, Brentford were drawn at home against Oxford United.

FA Cup

First team squad 
Players' ages are as of the opening day of the 2015–16 season.

Source: soccerbase.com

Coaching staff 
Last updated 1 February 2016

Statistics

Appearances and goals 

Last Updated 7 May 2016

|}
Source: brentfordfc.co.uk
Italic: denotes player is no longer with team

Goalscorers 

Last Updated 7 May 2016

Source: brentfordfc.co.uk
Italic: denotes player is no longer with team

Disciplinary record 

Last Updated 7 May 2016

Source: brentfordfc.co.uk
Italic: denotes player is no longer with team

Management 

Last Updated 7 May 2016

Summary 

Last Updated 7 May 2016

Development Squad

Playing squad 
Players' ages are as of the opening day of the 2015–16 senior season.

 Source: brentfordfc.co.uk

Results and table

Professional Development League Two South

U21 Premier League Cup 

 Source: Soccerway, brentfordfc.co.uk

Summary

References

Brentford
Brentford F.C. seasons